Quercus obtusata is an oak in the white oak group (Quercus sect. Quercus) endemic to Mexico, with a distribution ranging from San Luis Potosí and Nayarit south to Oaxaca, from 620 to 2800 MSL.

Resembles Q. potosina, which has smaller leaves (3–10 x 2–6 cm); also resembles Q. rugosa, this one has a convex leaf strongly coriaceous, a revolute margin, the epidermis bullate; at least, one can differentiate Q. obtusata from Q. laeta, which has foliar underside glaucous, without masses of glandular secretions, none or rare glandular trichomes, a leaf more oblong than oboval with a margin sometimes entire.

References

External links
photo of herbarium specimen at Missouri Botanical Garden, collected in México State in 1934

obtusata
Endemic oaks of Mexico
Plants described in 1809
Taxa named by Aimé Bonpland